This Is Radio Soulwax is a DJ mix album which was compiled and mixed by Belgian electronic band Soulwax, released in February 2006 as a covermount CD in that month's issue of Mixmag magazine in the United Kingdom.
It also features a song by Jackson & His Computer Band, who became known later in the year for their song "Utopia" being featured in an advertisement for O2.

Track listing

Soulwax - "Slowdance" (Nite Version) - 6:25
Digitalism - "Idealistic" - 2:28
Franz & Shape - "Countach" - 3:08
Vitalic - "Vitalic Fanfares" - 1:54
Franz Ferdinand - "Do You Want To" (Erol Alkan's Glam Racket) - 1:58
Adam Sky - "Ape-X" - 1:58
Namosh - "The Pulse" (Who Made Who Remix) - 2:42
Riton - "Angerman" (Riton Re-Dub) - 3:13
Simian - "Sick" - 5:20
Jackson & His Computer Band - "Arpeggio" - 3:48
LCD Soundsystem - "Too Much Love" - 3:38
Tiga - "Do it Don't Stop" - 4:12
Headman - "Roh" - 2:06
Kate Wax - "Killing Your Ghost" - 3:21
Justice - "Let There Be Light" - 4:49

References

Soulwax albums
2006 remix albums
2006 compilation albums